Gottfried is a masculine German given name. 
It is derived from the Old High German name , recorded since the 7th century.

The German name was commonly hypocoristically abbreviated as Götz from the late medieval period.
Götz and variants (including  Göthe, Göthke and Göpfert) also came into use as German surnames. Gottfried is a common Jewish surname as well.

Given name
The given name Gottfried became extremely frequent in Germany in the High Middle Ages, to the point of eclipsing most other names in God- (such as Godabert, Gotahard, Godohelm, Godomar, Goduin, Gotrat, Godulf, etc.)
The name was Latinised as Godefridus.
Medieval bearers of the name include:

Gotfrid, Duke of Alemannia and Raetia (d. 709)
Godefrid (d. c. 720), son of Drogo of Champagne, Frankish nobleman.
Godfrid Haraldsson (d. c. 856), Danish Viking leader
Godfrid, Duke of Frisia (d. 885), Danish Viking leader
Godfrey, Count Palatine of Lotharingia (d. 949)
Godfrey I, Duke of Lower Lorraine (d. 964)
Geoffrey I "Greymantle", Count of Anjou (d. 987)
Geoffrey I, Duke of Brittany (d. 1008)
Godfrey II, Duke of Lower Lorraine (d. 1023)
Geoffrey II "the Hammer", Count of Anjou (d. 1060)
Godfrey III, Duke of Lower Lorraine (d. 1069)
Godfrey of Bouillon (Godefridus Bullionensis, Godefroy de Bouillon, d. 1100), Frankish knight and leader of the First Crusade
Gottfried II of Raabs (d. c. 1137), burgrave of Nuremberg
Gottfried of Admont (d. 1165), Benedictine abbot 
Geoffrey II, Duke of Brittany (d. c. 1181)
Geoffrey of Clairvaux (d. after 1188), Cistercian abbot
Godfrey of Viterbo (Godefridus Viterbiensis, c. 1120 – c. 1196)
Geoffrey of Vinsauf (fl. 1200), medieval grammarian
Gottfried von Strassburg (d. 1210), author of a Middle High German courtly romance
Geoffrey of Villehardouin (d. c. 1212), knight and historian of the Fourth Crusade
Gottfried von Hohenlohe (1265–1310), Grand Master of the Teutonic Order
Gottfried von Hagenau (died 1313), poet, theologian and medical doctor from Alsace

A notable early modern bearer of the name is Gottfried Wilhelm von Leibniz (1646–1716).

Gottfried remains comparatively popular in Germany, ranking in the top 200 masculine given names.

Surname
 Gesche Gottfried (1785–1831), German serial killer
 John Gottfried (1917–1980), Canadian politician
 Martha Joy Gottfried (1925–2014), American landscape painter
 Robert W. Gottfried (1926–2007), American entrepreneur
 Martin Gottfried (1933–2014), American critic, columnist and author
 Dan Gottfried (1939– ), Israeli jazz pianist and lawyer
 Paul Gottfried (1941– ),  American political and philosophy professor
 Richard Gottfried (1947– ), American politician
 Brian Gottfried (1952– ), American tennis player 
 Gilbert Gottfried (1955–2022), American comedian and actor
 Mark Gottfried (1964– ), American basketball coach
 Keith Gottfried (1966– ), American lawyer

See also

 Galfrid
 Geoffrey, Geoffroy (surname), Jeffrey, Jeffries, Jeffers
 Godred/Guðrøðr
 Gofraid/Goraidh
 Godfrey, Godefroy

References

German-language surnames
German masculine given names
Jewish surnames